The Human Resources, Science and Technology Committee of the African Union was created to deal with the issues surrounding the development of Education, Illiteracy, Information technology, Communication, Human resources and Technology in Africa.

The chairperson of the committee is Armany Asfour.

Sectoral Cluster Committees of the Economic, Social and Cultural Council